Allium campanulatum is a species of wild onion known by the common name dusky onion or Sierra onion. This is a flowering plant native to the western United States from southeastern Washington and northern Oregon to southern California, and western Nevada. The dusky onion grows in foothills and mountains, especially in dry areas, such as chaparral habitats.

Description
The dusky onion, Allium campanulatum,  grows from a gray-brown bulb one to two centimeters wide which may extend tiny rhizomes and produce small daughter bulblets. It rises on a stout stem and has usually two long, thin leaves that wither before the flowers bloom.  On top of the stem is an inflorescence of 10 to 50 flowers. Each flower is half a centimeter to one centimeter wide and is pink, purple, or less often white, and each tepal has a dark-colored base. The tepals are variable in shape, from narrow and very pointy to spade-shaped. Anthers are purple; pollen yellow. Flowers bloom May to August.

See also
California chaparral and woodlands

References

campanulatum
Flora of California
Flora of Nevada
Flora of Oregon
Flora of Washington (state)
Flora of the Cascade Range
Flora of the Klamath Mountains
Flora of the Sierra Nevada (United States)
Natural history of the California chaparral and woodlands
Natural history of the Channel Islands of California
Natural history of the Central Valley (California)
Natural history of the Peninsular Ranges
Natural history of the San Francisco Bay Area
Natural history of the Santa Monica Mountains
Natural history of the Transverse Ranges
Onions
Plants described in 1879
Taxa named by Sereno Watson